Michael John Kay (born 30 October 1981) is a former English cricketer.

Kay made his List-A debut for Huntingdonshire against Oxfordshire in the first round of the 2001 Cheltenham & Gloucester Trophy.  He played a further match in the same competition against the Surrey Cricket Board.  His third and final List-A match for Huntingdonshire came against Cheshire in the 2002 Cheltenham & Gloucester Trophy.

Kay also played two Minor Counties Championship matches against Staffordshire in 2006 and Northumberland in 2007.

References

External links
Michael Kay at Cricinfo
Michael Kay at CricketArchive

1981 births
Living people
Cricketers from Bristol
English cricketers
Huntingdonshire cricketers
Cambridgeshire cricketers